Jussi Vatanen (born 30 January 1978) is a Finnish actor.

Career
Vatanen graduated from Theatre Academy Helsinki in 2005 and has since then worked for several Finnish theatres. He became a household name in Finland after joining the cast of a weekly sketch comedy show Putous in its second season in 2011. In the fourth season of the show in 2013, his character Karim Z. Yskowicz was crowned as the "sketch comedy character of the year". In the fifth season in 2014, he was again crowned as the winner with his female character "Antsku". Vatanen has also appeared in other television programs and films. In 2010, he was nominated for a Jussi Award for the Best Actor in a Leading Role for his work in a Dome Karukoski film Lapland Odyssey.

Personal life
Vatanen is married to a singer Marika Tuhkala. Together they have a daughter.

Selected filmography

In films
Lapland Odyssey (2010)
Dirty Bomb (2011)
Risto (2011)
Fanatics (2012)
The Hijack That Went South (2013)
Heart of a Lion (2013)
The Unknown Soldier (2017)

On television
Operaatio Interheil (2001)
Kymenlaakson laulu (2008)
Presidentin kanslia (2008–2011)
Putous (2011–2014)
Mr. Mallorca kohteessa (2011)
Kimmo (2012)
Huone 301 (English title:  Man in Room 301) (2019)

Discography

Albums
Saletisti natsaa (2011) as Mr. Mallorca
Olen somelainen (2013) as Karim Z. Yskowicz

References

External links

Finnish male film actors
1978 births
Finnish male television actors
Living people
People from Sonkajärvi